Nearly every hospital in the United States has a blood bank and transfusion service. The following is a list of groups that collect blood for transfusion and not a complete list of blood banks.

National organizations 
 American Red Cross (ARC), specifically the biomedical services division. The ARC provides about 35% of transfused blood in the US.
 America's Blood Centers (ABC), a North America's largest network of non-profit community blood centers. Most of the independent blood centers on this list are ABC members, and these account for approximately 60 percent of the U.S. blood supply.
 Blood Centers of America (BCA), a national cooperative of independent blood centers.
 Alliance for Community Transfusion Services (ACTS) is a strategic and operational alliance of independent blood centers that collect, process and distribute nearly 2 million blood products to patients in more than 750 hospitals and healthcare facilities throughout the United States. ACTS administers the nationwide emergency blood reserve known as the Blood Emergency Readiness Corps (BERC).
 New York Blood Center enterprise Founded in 1964 is a nonprofit organization that is one of the largest independent, community-based blood centers in the world. NYBC, along with its operating divisions Community Blood Center of Kansas City, Missouri (CBC), Innovative Blood Resources (IBR), Blood Bank of Delmarva (BBD), and Rhode Island Blood Center (RIBC), collect approximately 4,000 units of blood products each day and serve local communities of more than 75 million people in the Tri-State area (NY, NJ, CT), Mid Atlantic area (PA, DE, MD, VA), Missouri and Kansas, Minnesota, Nebraska, Rhode Island, and Southern New England. NYBC and its operating divisions also provide a wide array of transfusion-related medical services to over 500 hospitals nationally, including Comprehensive Cell Solutions, the National Center for Blood Group Genomics, the National Cord Blood Program, and the Lindsley F. Kimball Research Institute, which — among other milestones — developed a practical screening method for hepatitis B as well as a safe, effective and affordable vaccine, and a patented solvent detergent plasma process innovating blood-purification technology worldwide.
 Vitalant (formerly Blood Systems Inc.) is an independent nonprofit organization that collects blood from volunteer donors and provides blood, blood products and services across the United States.

Regional organizations 
This is a list of organizations by state or territory. Some of the names are very similar but refer to different organizations.

A-H 
 Alabama
 LifeSouth Community Blood Centers
 Alaska
 Blood Bank of Alaska
 Arkansas
Arkansas Blood Institute
 California
Central California Blood Center
Houchin Community Blood Bank
LifeStream Blood Bank
Northern California Community Blood Bank
San Diego Blood Bank
Stanford Blood Center
UCLA Blood & Platelet Center
 Colorado
 St. Mary's Hospital Blood Center
 Delaware
 Blood Bank of Delmarva
 Florida
Innovative Transfusion Medicine
LifeSouth Community Blood Centers
OneBlood
SunCoast Blood Centers
Winter Haven Hospital Community Blood Center
 Georgia
 Atlanta Blood Services
 LifeSouth Community Blood Centers
 Shepeard Community Blood Center
 The Blood Connection
 Hawaii
Blood Bank of Hawaii

I-M 

 Illinois
Community Blood Services of Illinois
ImpactLife (Formerly: Mississippi Valley Regional Blood Center)
Rock River Valley Blood Center
Versiti Illinois
 Indiana
 South Bend Medical Foundation
 Versiti Indiana
 Iowa
LifeServe Blood Center
ImpactLife (Formerly: Mississippi Valley Regional Blood Center)
 Kentucky
 Kentucky Blood Center
 Western Kentucky Regional Blood Center
 Louisiana
 East Jefferson General Hospital Blood Bank
 LifeShare Blood Center
 Ochsner Blood Bank
 Our Lady of the Lake Regional Medical Center
 The Blood Center
 Michigan
Versiti Michigan
 Mississippi
 Mississippi Blood Services
 Missouri
 Community Blood Center (Kansas City)
 Community Blood Center of the Ozarks

N-R 
Nebraska
Nebraska Community Blood Bank
 New York
ConnectLife
New York Blood Center
 North Carolina
 The Blood Connection
 Ohio
 Community Blood Center (Dayton)
 Hoxworth Blood Center
 Versiti Ohio
 Vitalant 
 Oklahoma
 Oklahoma Blood Institute
 Oregon
Bloodworks Northwest
Pennsylvania
Central Pennsylvania Blood Bank
Community Blood Bank of Northwest Pennsylvania and Western New York
Miller-Keystone Blood Center
 Rhode Island
Rhode Island Blood Center

S-Z 

South Carolina
The Blood Connection
 Tennessee
 Blood Assurance
 LIFELINE Blood Services
 Marsh Regional Blood Center
 MEDIC Regional Blood Center
 Texas
 Baylor Scott & White Blood Center
 Carter BloodCare
 Coastal Bend Blood Center
 Coffee Memorial Blood Center
 Gulf Coast Regional Blood Center
 Hendrick Regional Blood Center
 South Texas Blood & Tissue Center
 Texas Blood Institute
 We Are Blood
 Utah
 ARUP Blood Services
 Virginia
 Inova Blood Donor Services
 Washington
Cascade Regional Blood Services
Bloodworks Northwest
 Wisconsin
 Blood Center of Northcentral Wisconsin
Memorial Blood Centers
The Community Blood Center
Versiti Wisconsin

See also 
 Blood donation

References 

 
Lists of organizations based in the United States